Dino Ranch is a CGI animated children's television series created by Matthew Fernandes, co-founder and chief creative officer of Industrial Brothers. Dino Ranch follows the adventures of the Cassidy family as they tackle life on the ranch in a fantastical, prehistoric and Wild West-inspired setting where dinosaurs roam. The series debuted on CBC in Canada on January 16, 2021, and on Disney Junior in the United States on January 18, 2021, and later on Disney+ on June 18, 2021.

On July 28, 2021, it was announced that the series was renewed for a second season. On June 29, 2022, the second season premiered on Disney Junior in the United States. On October 13, 2022, it was announced that the series was renewed for a third season which is set to premiere in late Fall 2023.

Premise
Dino Ranch is a preschool adventure series set in a world where humans and dinosaurs live alongside each other. While Dino Ranch is first and foremost a working, self-sustained ranch run by the Cassidy family, it also serves as a dinosaur sanctuary.

Characters
Dino Ranch is operated by the Cassidy family, consisting of Bo and Jane Cassidy and their 3 adopted children, Jon, Min, and Miguel, and dinosaurs.

Main characters

  is 10 years old, the oldest kid in the Cassidy family, the leader of the three siblings and rides Blitz, the speedy velociraptor. Jon is an aspiring dino-trainer who is an expert on dinosaurs, and a terrific athlete. Voiced by Tyler Nathan in Season 1, and Jacob Soley in Season 2 onwards.
  is 8 years old, the middle child in the Cassidy family who is the only female of the trio, and rides Clover, the loving brontosaurus. Min is a dino-doctor in training and uses her medical expertise to help any sick or injured dino who needs Dino Ranch's help. Sometimes Min will be the leader of the Dino Ranchers and the Flyer and Rescue Squad instead of Jon. Voiced by Ava Ro.
  is 6 years old, the youngest child in the Cassidy family, and rides Tango, the tiny but mighty triceratops. Miguel is an inventor and loves to build things, especially new inventions he's come up with. Voiced by Jacob Mazeral.
  is Jon's best buddy and the fastest velociraptor around. Voiced by Joshua Graham.
  is a big-hearted brontosaurus and Min's dino-doctor assistant. Voiced by Deven Mack.
  is a mighty triceratops who loves to bash things and has incredible strength. She is Miguel's best friend and helps him build things. Voiced by Athena Karkanis.
 , or "Pa" to the Dino Ranchers, is the adoptive father of Jon, Min, and Miguel, and husband of Jane. He is an expert rancher and tends to the dino herds with his T-Rex, Biscuit. Voiced by Scott Gorman.
 , or "Ma" to the Dino Ranchers, is the adoptive mother of Jon, Min, and Miguel, and wife of Bo. She is the head dino doctor of the ranch and runs the Hatchery with her Parasaur, Quack. Voiced by Athena Karkanis.
  is Bo's Tyrannosaurus and the lead dinosaur of Dino Ranch.
  is Jane's Parasaurolophus and her dino-doctor assistant.
  is a fast-as-lightning Dimorphodon who is Jon and Blitz's flying partner who has a Turbo-Claw.
  is a gentle Thalassodromeus who is Min and Clover's flying partner who has a Dino Buggy.
  is a mighty Tapejara who is Miguel and Tango's flying partner who wields a Dino-Digger.

Supporting characters
  is a towering spinosaurus with a big appetite, this dino is the king of the badlands.
 is the Cassidy's tough, yet temperamental field plowing Triceratops.
  is the oldest (despite her stature) sibling and leader of the raptor-riding Tinhorn Trio, the Dino Ranchers’ mischievous rivals. The Trio likes to mess with the Dino Ranchers and their dinosaurs, and pull nasty stunts like taking a wild t-rex egg. Voiced by Samantha Weinstein.
  is the middle child of the Tinhorn Trio, and likes to challenge Clara's authority. Voiced by Jonah Wineberg.
  is the youngest of the Tinhorn Trio, and while he likes to go along with his older siblings’ naughty plans, he has a soft heart and occasionally helps the Dino Ranchers do the right thing as well. Voiced by Shayle Simons.
  is the greatest dino rustling mastermind of all time- or so he likes to say of himself. Sonny is a dinosaur super-fan and loves pulling rustling heists so he can ride on the amazing dinosaurs he admires so much. But while he is an incredible trickster, he’s a terrible rider. Voiced By Ian Ho.
  runs the Dino Airport with her dad, Zachary, and pterodactyl pal, Wilbur. Bold, adventurous, and a bit of a daredevil, Tara's the best pterodactyl-flyer around for when the Dino Ranchers need a helping hand from the air. Voiced by Shechinah Mpumlwana.
  is Tara's high-flying pterodactyl pal and the head of the Dino Airport's fleet of rescue pteros. The massive pterosaur is an expert flyer and can transport all of the Dino Ranchers through the sky in his Dino Porter.
  or "Captain Dacktle" is Tara's pterosaur-flying dad; an upbeat and uber-enthusiastic pioneer of pterosaur flying. Zach is a kind and loving parent, who's also a bit flighty and his head is always in the clouds. Voiced by Deven Mack.

Episodes

Series overview

Season 1 (2021-2022)

Season 2 (2022-)
On July 28, 2021, it was announced that the series was renewed for a second season.

Merchandise
Florida-based Jazwares is Dino Ranch's global master toy partner. Scholastic Corporation has the rights to design and produce a range of English-language consumer products, including readers, sticker story books, novelty items, activity books and audio books.

On August 25, 2021, Boat Rocker announced five new merchandising partnerships for Dino Ranch, including Baby Boom Consumer Products, High Point Design, Kurt S. Adler, Rubies, and Kennedy Publishing.

Release
In Canada, Dino Ranch is aired on CBC Television as well as its streaming website and mobile app CBC Gem. In the United States, the series is shown on Disney Junior, and its streaming video website and app DisneyNow, and later on Disney+ on 18 June 2021.

The series has subsequently been sold to Super RTL and Toggo Plus (Germany); Gulli, TiJi and Gulli Africa (France); NRK (Norway); YLE (Finland); Sveriges Television (Sweden); Croatian Radiotelevision (Croatia); Telewizja Polska (Poland); and DR (Denmark). On March 3, it was announced Dino Ranch was also sold to Disney+ U.K., Ireland, Australia and New Zealand. In United Kingdom, it debuted on Tiny Pop in 2022, Cartoonito in Italy, and in Australia, it will debut on ABC Kids soon. In Africa, it debuted on Boomerang on December 13, 2021. After 3 months later, Dino Ranch along new episodes will premiere on Boomerang Africa in April 2022 part of the Cartoonito block.

Dino Ranch premiered on Boomerang Turkey in January 2022 while, the series also premiered on Cartoon Network on February 7, 2022, part of the Cartoonito Block. While in MENA, Dino Ranch will premiered on Boomerang in April 2022. Dino Ranch premiered on Boomerang Italy in March 2022.

In Asia, it debuted on Cartoon Network on 28 March 2022 part of the Cartoonito block while, this show also sit in a dedicated Cartoonito programming rail on the regional streaming service HBO GO in Southeast Asia, Hong Kong and Taiwan, a launch event was in April 2022.  While in Japan, the show already premiered on Disney Junior in February 2022. In Spain, the series debuted on Clan in 2022

Reception
Dino Ranch was released on Disney Junior in the US as the number one cable series among kids, boys and girls 2–5. In the six weeks since the launch of the official Dino Ranch YouTube channel, it accumulated over three million views.

Dino Ranch is being adapted into a stage show by Fierylight and Terrapin Station Entertainment.

The series was one of the finalists for the audience-voted Shaw Rocket Fund Kids Choice Award, and Best Pre-School Program or Series at the 9th Canadian Screen Awards in 2021. Dino Ranch's first season was also nominated at the Rockie Awards of the Banff World Media Festival in the Preschool Animation category.

References

External links
 

2021 Canadian television series debuts
2020s Canadian animated television series
2020s Canadian children's television series
CBC Kids original programming
Canadian computer-animated television series
Western (genre) animated television series
Animated television series about children
Animated television series about dinosaurs
Animated television series about families
Canadian children's animated action television series
Canadian children's animated adventure television series
Canadian preschool education television series
Animated preschool education television series
2020s preschool education television series
2020s Western (genre) television series
Television series by Jam Filled Entertainment
Television series by Boat Rocker Media
English-language television shows
Disney Junior original programming